Lower Bucca is a tiny hamlet in Northern New South Wales, Australia. It is located North of Coffs Harbour on Bucca Road, off the Pacific Highway and in the City of Coffs Harbour local government area.

History
Lower Bucca was the site of significant gold prospecting in the 1800s and remnants of old gold mining shafts exist in the forests around the old school.

Decline
Lower Bucca Primary School closed in 1977 and was probably the last remaining landmark that defined the area. The school has since been converted to a community hall. An earlier and larger community hall (located at the intersection of McClellands Road and Bucca Road a few hundred metres east of the old primary school) fell into disuse around the same time that the school closed and was later demolished. In the late 1970s and early 1980s the old hall was the venue for community Christmas parties and dance nights.

References

External links
 https://archive.today/20060823105803/http://www.coffsharbour.nsw.gov.au/www/html/1185-lower-bucca-community-hall.asp
 http://www.abc.net.au/rural/telegraph/viewpoint/stories/s1409855.htm

Towns in New South Wales

Mining towns in New South Wales